Nelson Christian "Chris" Stokes has been an active member of the Jamaican Bobsleigh Team since its inception in 

Stokes was a successful track and field athlete, and after his associate degree from Bronx Community College, he was awarded an athletic scholarship to the University of Idaho in Moscow, Idaho. After finishing a bachelor's degree in finance (cum laude) at the U of I, he went on to earn an MBA from nearby Washington State University in Pullman and a masters in Banking (with honors) from Georgetown University in Washington, D.C.

While in graduate school at WSU, he tried out for the 1988 Summer Olympics in Seoul, and ended up in the Winter Olympics at Calgary.

His day job is as Vice President of Business Development at the Victoria Mutual Building Society. Stokes married Kayon Elizabeth Smith on 18 March 2006.

Olympics
Chris along with his brother Dudley Stokes competed in four separate winter Olympics.
 1988 – Competed in the Four-man event
 1992 – 36th place in the Two-man event
 1992 – 25th place in the Four-man event
 1994 – 14th place in the Four-man event
 1998 – 21st place in the Four-man event

In addition to his Olympic competition, Chris Stokes has been president of the Jamaica Bobsleigh Federation since 1995. He wrote Cool Runnings and Beyond – The Story of the Jamaica Bobsleigh Team about his team's Olympic competition.

References
6. THE JAMAICA BOBSLEIGH AND SKELETON FEDERATION (JBSF) "Legacy"  jamaicabobsled.com. Retrieved 23 May 2018

1963 births
Bobsledders at the 1988 Winter Olympics
Bobsledders at the 1992 Winter Olympics
Bobsledders at the 1994 Winter Olympics
Bobsledders at the 1998 Winter Olympics
Georgetown University alumni
Jamaican businesspeople
Jamaican male writers
Living people
Olympic bobsledders of Jamaica
Jamaican male bobsledders
People from Saint Andrew Parish, Jamaica
University of Idaho alumni
Washington State University alumni
Bronx Community College alumni
Jamaican expatriates in the United States